La Grande rinuncia (The Great Waiver) is a 1951 Italian melodrama film directed by Aldo Vergano.

Cast
 Lea Padovani as Elisabetta / Suor Teresa
 Luigi Tosi		
 Luigi Pavese

External links
 

1951 films
1950s Italian-language films
Films directed by Aldo Vergano
Italian drama films
1951 drama films
Melodrama films
1950s Italian films